Luis Emanuel López (born 16 August 1979) is an Argentine former professional footballer who played as a midfielder.

Career
López played the majority of his senior career with Defensores Unidos, first appearing in the first-team during the 1997–98 Primera B Metropolitana season. He made ten appearances in professional football that season, which finished with relegation to Primera C Metropolitana. He scored four goals in the following two campaigns of 1998–99 and 1999–2000; Defensores Unidos were relegated to Primera D Metropolitana in the latter. Five seasons later, the club suffered yet another relegation prior to rejoining Primera D Metropolitana in 2006 - López made one hundred and twenty appearances whilst scoring nine goals during that period.

In 2008, López joined Torneo Argentino B's La Emilia. However, he featured just once for the club's senior squad before departing. 2011 saw him join his final career club, Huracán in Torneo Argentino B. Four appearances followed.

Career statistics
.

References

External links
Luis López on BDFA's website

1979 births
Living people
People from Zárate Partido
Argentine footballers
Association football midfielders
Primera B Metropolitana players
Primera C Metropolitana players
Primera D Metropolitana players
Torneo Argentino B players
Defensores Unidos footballers
Club Social y Deportivo La Emilia players
Sportspeople from Buenos Aires Province